Verona Area School District (VASD) is the public school district for the cities of Verona and Fitchburg, Wisconsin, as well as a small part of Madison, Wisconsin. It consists of one high school, two middle schools, and six elementary schools. Its superintendent is Dr. Tremayne Clardy

Schools

High school
Verona Area High School

Middle schools
 Badger Ridge Middle School
 Savanna Oaks Middle School
 Core Knowledge Charter School

Elementary schools
 Core Knowledge Charter School
 Country View Elementary School
 Glacier Edge Elementary School
 New Century Charter School
 Stoner Prairie Elementary School
 Sugar Creek Elementary School

See also
Dane County, Wisconsin

External links
Verona Area School District website

School districts in Wisconsin
Education in Dane County, Wisconsin